Nicholas William Ridley-Colborne, 1st Baron Colborne (14 April 1779 – 3 May 1854) was a British politician.

Background
Born Nicholas Ridley, he was the younger son of Sir Matthew White Ridley, 2nd Baronet, and Sarah (d. 1806), daughter of Benjamin Colborne (see Viscount Ridley for earlier history of the family). In 1803 he assumed by Royal licence the additional surname of Colborne.

Political career
Ridley-Colborne sat as Member of Parliament for Bletchingley from 1805 to 1806, for Malmesbury from 1806 to 1807, for Appleby from 1807 to 1812, for Thetford from 1818 to 1826, for Horsham from 1827 to 1832 and for Wells from 1834 to 1837. In 1839 he was raised to the peerage as Baron Colborne, of West Harling in the County of Norfolk.

Family
Lord Colborne married Charlotte, daughter of Sir Thomas Steele, in 1808. They had five children:

 Maria Charlotte Ridley-Colborne (d. 31 August 1883)
 Henrietta Susannah Ridley-Colborne (1810 – June 1880)
 Emily Frances Ridley-Colborne (1811 – 13 October 1849),married John Moyer Heathcote on 11 April 1833
 William Nicholas Ridley-Colborne (24 July 1814 – 23 March 1846), MP for Richmond 1841-46
 Louisa Harriet Ridley-Colborne

Lord Colborne died in May 1854, aged 75 and was buried in Kensal Green Cemetery. As he had no surviving sons the barony became extinct. Lady Colborne died in February 1855.

References

External links 
 

1779 births
1854 deaths
Barons in the Peerage of the United Kingdom
Ridley-Colborne, Nicholas
Members of the Parliament of the United Kingdom for English constituencies
UK MPs 1802–1806
UK MPs 1806–1807
UK MPs 1807–1812
UK MPs 1818–1820
UK MPs 1820–1826
UK MPs 1826–1830
UK MPs 1830–1831
UK MPs 1831–1832
UK MPs 1832–1835
UK MPs 1835–1837
UK MPs who were granted peerages
Nicholas
People from Harling, Norfolk
Peers of the United Kingdom created by Queen Victoria